Miroslav Bičanić (born 29 October 1969) is a Croatian former professional footballer who played as a midfielder. He spent his club career in Croatia, Germany, Israel and China and made two appearances for the Croatia national team scoring one goal.

Club career
Bičanić was born in Đakovo. He moved to Bundesliga team MSV Duisburg in 1996, but played only 14 matches (one goal) in the championship and in the German Cup (one goal against Energie Cottbus). In the 1997–98 season, Bičanić played for Hapoel Haifa and reached the third place in the championship. His goal against Maccabi Tel Aviv was "Goal of the Year". After that he returned to Germany, signing with Hansa Rostock. As he played only several matches in the league and one in the cup (where he scored his only goal against Werder Bremen), Bičanić was unhappy with his status and came back to Israel.

He played two months for Hapoel Be'er Sheva and three for Bnei Yehuda before he joined Chongqing Lifan in February 2000. Bičanić won the Chinese FA Cup twice: 2000 with Chongqing Lifan and 2002 with Qingdao Jonoon.

International career
Bičanić made two appearances for the Croatia national team in friendlies against Ukraine (in 1993, one goal) and Hungary (in 1996).

Post-playing career
Today, Bičanić is a FIFA licensed players agent.

Career statistics

International goals
Scores and results list Croatia's goal tally first, score column indicates score after each Bičanić goal.

References

External links
 

1969 births
Living people
Sportspeople from Đakovo
Association football midfielders
Yugoslav footballers
Croatian footballers
Croatia international footballers
NK Osijek players
NK Zagreb players
MSV Duisburg players
Hapoel Haifa F.C. players
FC Hansa Rostock players
Hapoel Be'er Sheva F.C. players
Bnei Yehuda Tel Aviv F.C. players
Chongqing Liangjiang Athletic F.C. players
Sichuan Guancheng players
Qingdao Hainiu F.C. (1990) players
Yugoslav First League players
Croatian Football League players
Bundesliga players
Israeli Premier League players
Liga Leumit players
Chinese Super League players
Croatian expatriate footballers
Expatriate footballers in Germany
Croatian expatriate sportspeople in Germany
Expatriate footballers in Israel
Croatian expatriate sportspeople in Israel
Expatriate footballers in China
Croatian expatriate sportspeople in China